Son Myeong-jun (손명준, ; born 17 January 1994) is a South Korean long distance runner who specialises in the marathon. He competed in the men's marathon at the 2016 Summer Olympics.

Personal Bests
1500m - 3:52.57 (2018)
5000m - 13:55.03 (2014)
10000m - 30:00.00 (2012)
Half Marathon - 1:04:17 (2012)
Marathon - 2:12:34 (2016)

References

1994 births
Living people
South Korean male marathon runners
Olympic athletes of South Korea
Athletes (track and field) at the 2016 Summer Olympics
Place of birth missing (living people)
South Korean male long-distance runners
Olympic male marathon runners
21st-century South Korean people